The 2021–22 NBB season was the 14th season of the Novo Basquete Brasil (NBB), the highest level basketball league in Brazil. 

Franca won the championship after a 13-year drought, adding to its record of 12 Brazilian national championship.

Team changes 
Campo Mourão withdrew from the league. União Corinthians made its NBB debut and returned to the highest national level after an 19-year absence. Rio Claro also returned to the league this season.

Regular season 

Source: NBB

Playoffs

Statistics

Individual statistical leaders 
Leaders after the regular season.

References 

Novo Basquete Brasil seasons
2021–22 in basketball leagues